The 1929–30 Fenn College Foxes men's basketball team represented Fenn College in the 1929–30 college basketball season. They participated in the National Collegiate Athletic Association (NCAA). The team was led by first-year head coach Homer E. Woodling. This was the first year of basketball in Fenn College's history.

Schedule 

Cleveland State Vikings men's basketball seasons
Fenn College Foxes
Cleveland
Cleveland